Earl Ramage Lewis (February 22, 1887 – February 1, 1956) was an American lawyer and politician who served four terms as a U.S. Representative from Ohio.

Biography
Born in Lamira, Ohio, Lewis attended the public and high schools. He graduated from Muskingum College in New Concord, Ohio, in 1911, and from the law department of Western Reserve University, Cleveland, Ohio, in 1914.
He was admitted to the bar the same year and commenced practice in St. Clairsville, Ohio.

He served as member of the Ohio State Senate in 1927 and 1928, and then served as chairman of the Republican State campaign committee for Ohio in 1930. Continuing in politics, Lewis returned to the Ohio senate in 1931 and stayed until 1934, serving as president pro tempore in 1931 and 1932 and as Republican floor leader from 1931 to 1934. He also served as member of the Interstate Commission on Conflicting Taxation of the American Legislators Association from 1931 to 1935.

After his time in the Ohio senate, Lewis was elected as a Republican to the Seventy-sixth Congress (January 3, 1939 – January 3, 1941). After his unsuccessful run for reelection in 1940, he resumed the practice of law, but soon ran again. Lewis was elected to the Seventy-eighth, Seventy-ninth, and Eightieth Congresses (January 3, 1943 – January 3, 1949). He was an unsuccessful candidate for reelection in 1948, and again resumed the practice of law.

Lewis later served as trustee of Muskingum College. He died in Wheeling, West Virginia, and was interred in Union Cemetery in St. Clairsville, Ohio.

Sources

1887 births
1956 deaths
People from Belmont County, Ohio
Presidents of the Ohio State Senate
Ohio lawyers
Muskingum University alumni
Case Western Reserve University School of Law alumni
20th-century American politicians
20th-century American lawyers
Republican Party members of the United States House of Representatives from Ohio